Dennis Martin Daugaard (born June 11, 1953) is an American attorney and politician who served as the 32nd governor of South Dakota from 2011 to 2019. A member of the Republican Party, he was the first chief executive of a U.S. state to be the child of deaf parents. Before being elected governor, he was a lawyer, banker, development director for a nonprofit organization; he also served as a state senator from 1997 to 2003 and the 37th lieutenant governor of South Dakota from 2003 to 2011.

Background, education and family
Dennis Martin Daugaard was born in 1953 and raised on a family farm near Garretson, South Dakota, the son of Florence Margaret (Kennedy) and Raymond Victor Daugaard. Both his parents were deaf. His paternal grandparents were immigrants from Denmark. While Dennis Daugaard was growing up, his family's primary language at home was American Sign Language. Daugaard went to a local one-room country school as a child. For high school, he had to go to the city of Dell Rapids; there he played the French horn. He graduated in 1971.

Daugaard attended the University of South Dakota in Vermillion where he was advised by William O. Farber. He graduated from USD in 1975 with a Bachelor of Science in government and from Northwestern University School of Law in 1978. Daugaard worked to pay his way through law school as an ASL interpreter, a bus driver, a law clerk and a security guard.

Early career

Daugaard worked as an attorney in Chicago from 1978 to 1981 before returning to South Dakota. He married Linda that year and they have three children: Laura, who is married to Jay Mitchell; Sara, who is married to Tony Venhuizen; and Christopher, who is married to Emily Conway.

Daugaard worked as an executive banker in Sioux Falls, South Dakota, from 1981 to 1990. He then worked for the Children's Home Society of South Dakota, as Development Director from 1990 to 2002 and Executive Director from 2002 to 2009.

Daugaard's first entry into electoral politics came in 1996, when he was elected to the South Dakota State Senate as a Republican. He remained a state senator until he was elected the 37th Lieutenant Governor of South Dakota in 2002 as the running mate of Governor Mike Rounds, a position he held for eight years.

Service as state senator
While serving in the state legislature, Daugaard said his priorities were helping children and the disabled, as well as reducing crime.

South Dakota lieutenant governor
Daugaard was elected lieutenant governor in 2002 and reelected in 2006. As a lieutenant governor, he served as the President of the South Dakota Senate. In addition, he served as the chair of the Workers' Compensation Advisory Council, which reviews and makes recommendations regarding South Dakota's worker compensation program. While lieutenant governor, Daugaard also fulfilled other duties assigned by the governor and delegated by the state constitution. He served as a member of a commission that dealt with state constitutional amendments and was chairman of a task force that considered options to reduce the number of South Dakotans lacking health insurance.

In 2009, Daugaard promoted legislation to establish the South Dakota Ellsworth Development Authority to promote and manage economic development in Rapid City and other areas surrounding Ellsworth Air Force Base in western South Dakota. He has also promoted the Honor Flight program, which honors World War II veterans.

2010 and 2014 gubernatorial campaigns

In 2010 Daugaard ran for the Republican nomination for governor. He won the primary election against several other candidates. Daugaard chose Matt Michels as his running mate. His campaign was led by his son-in-law Tony Venhuizen.

The Daugaard/Michels ticket beat Democratic nominees Scott Heidepriem and Ben Arndt by 61.5% to 38.5% in the November general election. Daugaard was the first child of deaf adults to be elected governor of any state. During his campaign, he stressed that he has often promoted issues affecting the deaf and hard of hearing, and is sympathetic to their children, most of whom are hearing, as he is.

Daugaard and Michels were reelected in 2014.

Daugaard administrations

In 2011, Daugaard established the first Office of Tribal Relations in his cabinet, appointing J.R. LaPlante (Cheyenne River Sioux) as its secretary. No other state government has such an office. LaPlante had a law practice in Vermillion, and had served as the "chief judge and court administrator for the Crow Creek Sioux Tribe in Fort Thompson. In addition, he had served as an administrative officer for the Cheyenne River Sioux Tribe." He worked with Daugaard to build government-to-government working relationships on issues such as "housing, economic development, public safety, and human services." He used mediation to resolve conflicts, for instance reaching agreement among state, county and tribal officials in Charles Mix County to recognize the Yankton Sioux's historical presence in highway signage. In 2011, Daugaard appointed Dusty Johnson as his chief of staff. In 2014, he appointed his son-in-law and former campaign director Tony Venhuizen as his chief of staff.

According to a Morning Consult poll conducted from May through September 2016, Daugaard was the most popular governor of any U.S. state, with a 74% statewide approval rating. In rankings published in July 2018, he was 5th most popular, with an approval rating of 61%.

On October 23, 2018, Daugaard endorsed Kristi Noem for governor in the imminent election.

Electoral history

References

External links

|-

|-

|-

|-

1953 births
2004 United States presidential electors
2008 United States presidential electors
2012 United States presidential electors
2016 United States presidential electors
20th-century American lawyers
20th-century American politicians
21st-century American politicians
American people of Danish descent
American people of Norwegian descent
American people of Swedish descent
American Lutherans
Businesspeople from South Dakota
Republican Party governors of South Dakota
Illinois lawyers
Lieutenant Governors of South Dakota
Living people
Northwestern University Pritzker School of Law alumni
People from Minnehaha County, South Dakota
South Dakota lawyers
Republican Party South Dakota state senators
University of South Dakota alumni
American Sign Language interpreters